Hans Backoffen (c. 1460-1475 — 21 September 1519, Mainz) was a German sculptor.

Further reading 
 Belkin, Kristin. "Backoffen, Hans." In The Oxford Companion to Western Art, edited by Hugh Brigstocke. Oxford Art Online, (accessed January 31, 2012; subscription required).

External links 
 

15th-century German sculptors
German male sculptors
16th-century German sculptors
15th-century births
1519 deaths
People from Miltenberg (district)